Thomas Francis O'Hara  (July 13, 1880 – June 8, 1954) was an outfielder in Major League Baseball. He played for the St. Louis Cardinals.

External links

1880 births
1954 deaths
Major League Baseball outfielders
St. Louis Cardinals players
Baseball players from New York (state)
Lancaster Red Roses players
Williamsport Millionaires players
Albany Senators players
People from Waverly, Tioga County, New York